Khabash, also Khababash or Khabbash, resided at Sais in the fifth nome of Lower Egypt in the fourth century BC. During the second Persian occupation of Egypt (343–332 BC) he led a revolt against the Persian rule in concert with his eldest son, from ca. 338 to 335 BC, a few years before the conquest of Egypt by Alexander the Great. It is said that Nectanebo II, the exiled last native ruler of Egypt, may have helped in these events, but he was possibly sidelined for good as a result of the failure of the revolt.

Little is known about Khabash. He is referred to as "Lord of both lands", i.e. King of Upper and Lower Egypt, and as "Son of Ra", another pharaonic title, and given the throne name of Senen-setep-en-Ptah in a decree by Ptolemy Lagides, who became King Ptolemy I Soter in 305 BC.

Sometime in the 330s BC, an Egyptian ruler called Kambasuten – who is widely recognized as Khabash – led an invasion into the kingdom of Kush which was defeated by king Nastasen as recorded in a stela now in the Berlin museum. An Apis bull sarcophagus bearing his name was found in the Serapeum of Saqqara, dating to his second regnal year.

References

External links 
Small bibliography of books mentioning Khababash
Homestead Nastasen Stela

4th-century BC Pharaohs
4th-century BC rulers
Non-dynastic pharaohs
Egyptian rebels